Kokoda Front Line! was a full-length edition of the Australian newsreel, Cinesound Review, produced by the Australian News & Information Bureau and Cinesound Productions Limited in 1942, about the Kokoda Track campaign. It was one of four winners of the 15th Academy Awards for best documentary, and the first Australian film to win an Oscar. It was filmed by the  Australian war photographer Damien Parer and directed by Ken G. Hall.

Damien Parer is often cited as one of Australia's early Academy Award winners, however the award was made to the director, Ken G. Hall.

Much of Parer's footage was used in a documentary made by a rival company, Movietone, The Road to Kokoda.

See also 
List of Allied propaganda films of World War II

References

External links 
 Kokoda Front Line! on Youtube

Kokoda Front Line at Oz Movies

Best Documentary Feature Academy Award winners
1942 films
1940s short documentary films
Australian short documentary films
Australian World War II propaganda films
Australian black-and-white films
Pacific War films
Films directed by Ken G. Hall
Films set in Papua New Guinea
Kokoda
1942 documentary films
1940s English-language films
1940s Australian films